Eric LaMon Wright (born August 4, 1969) is a former American football wide receiver. He played for the Chicago Bears from 1991 to 1992.

References 

1969 births
Living people
American football wide receivers
Stephen F. Austin Lumberjacks football players
Chicago Bears players